Thomas Ritter (born 10 October 1967) is a German former professional footballer who played as a defender.

Club career 
Ritter was born in Görlitz. He amassed over 180 appearances in the East and unified German top-flight. Next to his stints in German clubs he played in Austria and China.

International career 
In 1987 Ritter was part of East Germany's bronze medal team at the FIFA World Youth Championship in Chile. The defender played one game for Germany on 13 October 1993 in a friendly against Uruguay – as a substitute for Stefan Effenberg.

Honours
 DDR-Oberliga: 1988–89
 Bundesliga runner-up: 1993–94
 DFB-Pokal runner-up: 1995–96

References

External links
 
 
 

1967 births
Living people
East German footballers
German footballers
Association football defenders
Germany international footballers
DDR-Oberliga players
Bundesliga players
2. Bundesliga players
Austrian Football Bundesliga players
Dynamo Dresden players
Dynamo Dresden II players
Bischofswerdaer FV 08 players
Stuttgarter Kickers players
1. FC Kaiserslautern players
Karlsruher SC players
SC Austria Lustenau players
Changchun Yatai F.C. players
German expatriate footballers
German expatriate sportspeople in China
Expatriate footballers in China
German expatriate sportspeople in Austria
Expatriate footballers in Austria
People from Görlitz
Footballers from Saxony
People from Bezirk Dresden